Elías Pino Iturrieta (Maracaibo, Venezuela, 9 October 1944) is a Venezuelan writer and historian. He served as Director of the Venezuelan Academy of History, which he joined on 27 February 1997. Is Director of the Institute for Historical Research at Andrés Bello Catholic University, since 1999. He graduated from UCV in 1962, and obtained a doctorate from El Colegio de México in 1969.

Works 
La mentalidad venezolana de la Emancipación
Contra lujuria castidad
Ventaneras y castas
Diabólicas y honestas
La mirada del otro
Viajeros extranjeros en la Venezuela del siglo XIX
Fueros, civilización y ciudadanía,
Venezuela metida en cintura
País archipiélago
El Divino Bolívar
Nada sino un hombre
Ideas y mentalidades de Venezuela

See also
Venezuela
List of Venezuelan writers
List of Venezuelans

References 

1944 births
Living people
Venezuelan male writers
20th-century Venezuelan historians
Central University of Venezuela alumni
Academic staff of Andrés Bello Catholic University
People from Maracaibo
21st-century Venezuelan historians